Liza Smith (née Parker; born 30 October 1980) is a retired English badminton player.

Career summary 
Smith played for almost 10 years in her career. Meantime she reached No. 14 in the world in mixed doubles and No. 15 in women's doubles as well as being No. 3 in England in women's doubles. Her best year on the international circuit was 2004 when she won both mixed and women's doubles titles at the Canadian Open as well as winning the Norwegian and Iceland women's doubles titles. She was also a Hertfordshire county stalwart and played for Redstar Mulhouse in France. She made her debut for country when she played women's doubles with Jo Davies against China in 1999 but only won a total of six caps. She was born in the era of other prominent doubles stars from England and wasn't fortunate enough to represent the country at the Olympics or Commonwealth games. She has also the degree in Physiotherapy from University of London.

Achievements

European Junior Championships 
Girls' doubles

IBF World Grand Prix
The World Badminton Grand Prix sanctioned by International Badminton Federation (IBF) since 1983.

Women's doubles

IBF/BWF International 
Women's doubles

Mixed doubles

 BWF International Challenge tournament
 BWF International Series tournament

References 

1980 births
Living people
English female badminton players